In particle physics, a radiative process refers to one elementary particle emitting another and continuing to exist.  This typically happens when a fermion emits a boson such as a gluon or photon.

See also
Bremsstrahlung

Radiation
Particle physics